Camel is a color that resembles the color of the hair of a camel.

The first recorded use of camel as a color name in English was in 1916.

The normalized color coordinates for camel are identical to fallow, wood brown and desert, which were first recorded as color names in English in 1000, 1886, and 1920, respectively.

Fashion

Camel is the color of a specific type of overcoat known as a polo coat or camel-hair coat.  In a 1951 Collier's magazine fashion article, it is said camel colored polo coats are proper to wear in the summer, in the country and in the U.S. South, but navy blue overcoats are proper to wear in the city and in autumn, winter and spring.

See also
 List of colors

Notes

References

Bibliography

Citations

Shades of brown